Lisa Pou (born 28 May 1999) is a French swimmer.

She competed in the Team event at the 2018 European Aquatics Championships, winning the bronze medal.

References

1999 births
Living people
French female long-distance swimmers
French female freestyle swimmers
European Aquatics Championships medalists in swimming
20th-century French women
21st-century French women